Huaisi is a town in Hanjiang District, Yangzhou, Jiangsu, China. , it administers two residential neighborhoods, Jiudian and Jufu, as well as the following 13 villages:
Yunhe Village
Shenying Village
Fenglai Village
Longwei Village
Tuanjie Village
Linqiao Village
Xuxiang Village
Xiaohu Village
Chengou Village
Chenyuan Village
Jiudian Village
Baojia Village
Hangzhuang Village

References

Township-level divisions of Jiangsu
Hanjiang District, Yangzhou